IEEE Transactions on Education is a quarterly peer-reviewed academic journal on engineering education that is published by the IEEE Education Society. It covers the area of education research, methods, materials, programs, and technology in electrical engineering, computer engineering, and fields within the scope of interest of the Institute of Electrical and Electronics Engineers. The journal was known as the IRE Transactions on Education from 1958 through 1962. The editor-in-chief is John E. Mitchell (University College London).

According to the Journal Citation Reports, the journal has a 2018 impact factor of 2.274.

Editors-in-chief
The following people are or have been editor-in-chief:

References

External links

Transactions on Education
Education journals
Publications established in 1958
English-language journals
Quarterly journals